Energized is the third album by rock band Foghat, released in January 1974. It peaked at #34 on the Billboard 200 and was certified as an RIAA Gold Record in the United States.

Track listing
 "Honey Hush" – 4:19 (Big Joe Turner as "Lou W. Turner")
Interpolates music from "Train Kept A-Rollin'" by Tiny Bradshaw, Howard Kay, and Lois Mann.
 "Step Outside" – 6:18 (Dave Peverett, Rod Price, Roger Earl, Tony Stevens)
 "Golden Arrow" – 4:03 (Peverett, Price)
 "Home in My Hand" – 5:09 (Peverett, Price)
 "Wild Cherry" – 5:27 (Peverett, Price, Earl, Stevens, Tom Dawes)
 "That'll Be the Day" – 2:33 (Jerry Allison, Buddy Holly, Norman Petty)
 "Fly by Night" – 4:47 (Stevens)
 "Nothin' I Won't Do" – 6:54 (Peverett, Price)

An edited version of "Step Outside" was released as a single, with a B-side of "Maybelline" from the band's first album, Foghat.

Personnel
Foghat
 Dave Peverett – guitar, vocals
 Rod Price – guitar, slide guitar, dobro, vocals
 Tony Stevens – bass, vocals
 Roger Earl – drums, percussion

Other
 Tom Dawes – production
 Tony Outeda – coordination
 Pacific Eye and Ear – album design

Charts

Certifications

References

1974 albums
Foghat albums
Bearsville Records albums